

The Prisoner of the Caucasus ( Kavkázskiy plénnik), also translated as Captive of the Caucasus, is a narrative poem written by Alexander Pushkin in 1820–21  and published in 1822.  Dedicated to his friend General Nikolay Raevsky, it was inspired by the poet's time spent in Pyatigorsk during his southern exile.

The poem is about a Byronic Russian officer who is disillusioned with elite life and decides to escape by seeking adventure in the Caucasus.  He is captured by Circassian tribesmen but then saved by a beautiful Circassian woman.  Despite its Romantic and Orientalist themes, Pushkin's use of academic footnotes and reliable ethnographic material gave it credibility in its day.  It was highly influential on popular perceptions of the Caucasus for its time.  The poem remains one of Pushkin's most famous works and is often referenced in Russian popular culture, in films such as the Soviet comedy Kidnapping, Caucasian Style.

English translations
 Roger Clarke, in

See also
 Russian conquest of the Caucasus
 The Prisoner of the Caucasus, a short story by Leo Tolstoy
 A Journey to Arzrum, a later work by Pushkin on the Caucasus

References

External links 
  The text of The Prisoner of the Caucasus at Russian Wikisource

Poetry by Aleksandr Pushkin
1821 poems
Narrative poems